Wushu was contested by both men and women at the 2010 Asian Games in Guangzhou, China from November 13 to 17, 2010. All events were held at Nansha Gymnasium.

Schedule

Medalists

Men's taolu

Men's sanda

Women's taolu

Women's sanda

Medal table

Participating nations
A total of 193 athletes from 32 nations competed in wushu at the 2010 Asian Games:

References

External links
Official website

 
2010
2010 Asian Games events
2010 in wushu (sport)